XHCPH-FM is a radio station in Parral, Chihuahua, Mexico. Broadcasting on 96.9 FM from a transmitter on Cerro Púlpito, XHCPH is owned by Grupo Garza Limón and carries a grupera format known as La Tremenda.

History
The station's concession was awarded in 1990. Until 2015, XHCPH operated with an effective radiated power of 100 kW; it received authorization that year to change ERP to 50 kW.

References

Radio stations in Chihuahua